Since Iowa became a U.S. state in 1846, it has sent congressional delegations to the United States Senate and United States House of Representatives. Each state elects two senators to serve for six years, and members of the House to two-year terms. Before becoming a state, the Iowa Territory elected a non-voting delegate at-large to Congress from 1838 to 1846.

These are tables of congressional delegations from Iowa to the United States Senate and the United States House of Representatives.

Current delegation 

Iowa's current congressional delegation in the  consists of its two senators and four representatives, all Republicans.

The current dean of the Iowa delegation is Senator and President pro tempore emeritus of the United States Senate Chuck Grassley, having served in the Senate since 1981 and in Congress since 1975.

United States Senate

United States House of Representatives

1838–1846: 1 non-voting delegate 
On July 4, 1838, the Iowa Territory was organized. Most of the area comprising the territory was originally part of the Louisiana Purchase and was a part of the Missouri Territory. When Missouri became a state in 1821, this area (along with the Dakotas) effectively became unorganized territory. The area was closed to white settlers until the 1830s, after the Black Hawk War ended. It was attached to the Michigan Territory on June 28, 1834, and was split off with the Wisconsin Territory in 1836 when Michigan became a state. The Iowa Territory was the "Iowa District" of western Wisconsin Territory – the region west of the Mississippi River.

Starting on September 10, 1838, Iowa Territory sent a non-voting delegate to the House.

1846–1863: 2 seats 
Following statehood on December 28, 1846, Iowa had two seats in the House. It elected both seats statewide at-large on a general ticket, until 1847, when it redistricted into two districts.

1863–1873: 6 seats 
Following the 1860 census, Iowa was apportioned 6 seats.

1873–1883: 9 seats 
Following the 1870 census, Iowa was apportioned 9 seats.

1883–1933: 11 seats 
Following the 1880 census, Iowa was apportioned 11 seats.

1933–1943: 9 seats 
Following the 1930 census, Iowa was apportioned 9 seats.

1943–1963: 8 seats 
Following the 1940 census, Iowa was apportioned 8 seats.

1963–1973: 7 seats 
Following the 1960 census, Iowa was apportioned 7 seats.

1973–1993: 6 seats 
Following the 1970 census, Iowa was apportioned 6 seats.

1993–2013: 5 seats 
Following the 1990 census, Iowa was apportioned 5 seats.

2013–present: 4 seats 
Following the 2010 census, Iowa was apportioned 4 seats.

Key

See also 

List of United States congressional districts
Iowa's congressional districts
Political party strength in Iowa

References 

 
 
Iowa
Politics of Iowa
Congressional delegations